SunStroke Project is a Moldovan musical group composed of Sergei Yalovitsky (vocals, composer), Sergey Stepanov (saxophonist), and previously Anton Ragoza (violinist, composer) until his departure in 2019. They achieved recognition after representing Moldova in the Eurovision Song Contest 2010 alongside Olia Tira with the song "Run Away", and again in the 2017 contest with "Hey Mamma", finishing in third place in the latter. The name of the group was chosen by Ragoza whilst working in the army with Stepanov, after he had an incident in which he was affected by heat stroke whilst on a field exercise.

Members
Anton Ragoza was born on 6 January 1986 in Tiraspol, MSSR. He is the violinist and primary musical composer for the band. Previously he has conducted the orchestra of Chișinău and won a series of prestigious awards in the field of classical music. Anton has a wide experience in performing in bands which play in the modern electronic genre. He identified Justin Timberlake and Michael Jackson as musical inspirations. Sergey Stepanov is the saxophonist. He was born on 3 September 1984 in Tiraspol. He currently lives in Chișinău, Moldova. His musical taste took contours on the music of artists such as David Sanborn and Eric Marienthal; and modern DJs like David Guetta, David Vendetta and Tiësto. He loves jazz though he also likes to experiment in vocal house, pop and R&B. He met Ragoza while in the army, and decided to create the band SunStroke Project. In an interview at the 2010 Eurovision Song Contest, he identified Russian saxophonist Igor Butman as his musical inspiration. Sergei Yalovitsky is the vocalist of the band. He previously worked as a singer on cruise lines. He has won various awards for singing in Moldova and Romania.

Career

2007–2008: "Sunstroke" era: Early pre-vocal releases
Shortly after the band was founded in 2007, their first (and as of 2014, only) official album, Don't Word More.., was released. The album is very rare, and only a few tracks are currently known to have been a part of it. One track, "Scream", is known to be the predecessor to Scream released a few years later with Myslicky.

2008–2009: Pasha Parfeny era
From late 2008 to summer 2009, Moldovan vocalist Pasha Parfeny joined the band. Three singles were released during this few-month period. Each were produced by Alex Brashovean of the former Moldovan band O-Zone. They sang for the Eurovision 2009 pre-selection for Moldova, where they took the 3rd place with the hit No Crime. Nelly Ciobanu was elected to represent Moldova at the contest that year.

2010: Eurovision, Myslitsky era
"Believe" was the first new single to be released by the band with Sergei Yalovitsky as lead vocalist (A reworked In Your Eyes was the first single to be released with Yalovitsky). It was also their original entry to Moldova's national selection for Eurovision 2010 until it was withdrawn (as well as Olia Tira's entry) in favor of "Run Away". SunStroke Project together with Olia Tira represented Moldova in the Eurovision Song Contest 2010 with the song "Run Away". The final of the O melodie pentru Europa 2010 pre-selection took place in Chișinău on 6 March 2010, with the song gaining the maximum 12 points from both the jury and SMS-voting. The song reached 22nd place in the contest. Along with DJ Alexei Myslicky, several other singles were produced throughout 2010. He later departed to form Offbeat Orchestra in Russia in late 2010.

2011–present: Touring, yearly singles and Eurovision 2017
Since 2011, Sunstroke Project has toured extensively and has worked more closely with their longtime label, Sens Music. An entry was made for SunStroke Project and Olia Tira to represent Moldova in the 2012 Eurovision Song Contest with the single "Superman" but it did not make the next stage of selection. SunStroke Project attempted to represent Moldova in the 2015 Eurovision Song Contest entering with two songs: "Lonely" and "Day After Day", the latter with Michael Ra. Both entries qualified to the semi-final from the live audition round. However, as only one song could be chosen per artist, Sunstroke Project chose "Day After Day" to ultimately move forward. After qualifying from the semi-final, they finished third in the national final. SunStroke Project attempted to represent Moldova in the 2017 Eurovision Song Contest once again, with the upbeat electro-house song "Hey, Mamma!". The band came in first place after a tight voting procedure, qualifying them to represent Moldova in the Song Contest in May. They reached third place with their performance in the 2017 competition, giving Moldova their best result in the contest. On returning to Moldova, SunStroke Project was awarded the Order of Honour by the President of Moldova Igor Dodon. Sunstroke Project were also featured in Season 2 of the Netflix series, "Travels With My Father," wherein British comedian Jack Whitehall travels to Moldova with his father, Michael Whitehall, in order to meet and perform with the members of Sunstroke Project.
In 2023, the band participated once again in the Moldovan national final with the song "Yummy Mommy" and placed second behind the winner and the band's former lead singer Pasha Parfeny.

Discography

Studio albums

Extended plays

Singles

As lead artist

As featured artist

Promotional singles

Cover songs

Internet phenomena
Sergey Stepanov's saxophone solo in the 2010 Eurovision Song Contest for the song "Run Away" became famous across the Internet in a meme known as "Epic Sax Guy" or "Saxroll". The remixes of his saxophone solo have millions of hits on YouTube. Later, this song is used more as background music of video gaming(such as Hearthstone and Rainbow Six Siege)"Best moments" videos.

In December 2010 SunStroke Project appeared on Moldovan TV programme Sare şi piper and sang a song titled "Epic Sax", named after the meme.

The phrase "Epic Sax Guys" forms part of the lyrics of the SunStroke Project's single "Superman", when they unsuccessfully attempted to represent Moldova in the 2012 Eurovision Song Contest.

Stepanov himself acknowledged his viral fame playing the Run Away saxophone riff when the group was interviewed during the first semi-finals of the 2017 Eurovision Song Contest. During the performance of Hey Mamma in the 2017 contest, Stepanov again became a minor internet meme in the form of "Ultra Sax Guy".

In 2020 the character Jax got a so-called friendship ending move in the Aftermath expansion of the video game Mortal Kombat 11 in which Jax was playing the sax in a similar fashion to Stepanov. Over half a million views were soon viral with the title "Epic Jax Guy".

Notes

References

External links

 

Moldovan musical groups
Eurovision Song Contest entrants for Moldova
Eurovision Song Contest entrants of 2010
Eurovision Song Contest entrants of 2017
2007 establishments in Moldova